"Lakini's Juice" is a song by alternative rock group Live, which was released as the first single from their 1997 album, Secret Samadhi. The song opens with abrasive staccato guitar and features an orchestra towards the end. There is a constant dissonance running throughout the track. The B-side track "Supernatural" is a live recording, made at "The Academy" in New York City on November 19, 1994; although this particular version was previously unreleased, a different performance of the same song, from the band's appearance on MTV Unplugged, previously appeared on the Vic Chesnutt tribute album Sweet Relief II: Gravity of the Situation in 1996.

"Lakini's Juice" was not released as a single in the United States, but it reached number 35 on the Billboard Hot 100 Airplay chart, number one on the Billboard Modern Rock Tracks chart and number two on the Mainstream Rock Tracks chart. The song also reached number 29 on the UK Singles Chart, the band's highest UK chart position, and became a top-forty hit in Australia, Canada and New Zealand. The music video for the song was directed by Gavin Bowden.

Track listings
All songs were written by Live except "Supernatural", written by Vic Chesnutt.

European CD single
 "Lakini's Juice" – 5:02
 "Pain Lies on the Riverside" (club mix) – 6:01
 "Selling the Drama" (acoustic) – 3:38

European limited-edition 7-inch single
Individually numbered and pressed on silver vinyl
 "Lakini's Juice" – 5:02
 "Supernatural" (live) – 3:26

Netherlands CD single
 "Lakini's Juice" – 5:01
 "White, Discussion" (Sam Sever remix) – 4:23

Australian single
 "Lakini's Juice" – 5:02
 "White, Discussion" (Sam Sever remix) – 4:23
 "Supernatural" (live) – 3:26

Charts

Weekly charts

Year-end charts

Release history

References

External links
 

Live (band) songs
1997 singles
1997 songs
Radioactive Records singles
Songs written by Ed Kowalczyk